The Sports Association of Tasmanian Independent Schools (SATIS) is a group of sixteen schools in Tasmania, Australia formed by AHISA Tasmania to conduct sporting competitions for member schools. NSATIS and SSATIS are regional bodies which organise and conduct competitions in their respective regions.

Schools

Current member schools

Sports
 Athletics
 Cricket
 Football
 Hockey
 Netball
 Rowing
 Soccer
 Softball
 Swimming
 Tennis

Head of the River Regatta

See also
 List of schools in Tasmania

References

External links
 Sports Association of Tasmanian Independent Schools

Private schools in Tasmania
Australian school sports associations
Schools